Periaxin is a protein that in humans is encoded by the PRX gene.

The PRX gene encodes L- and S-periaxin, proteins of myelinating Schwann cells, and is mutated in Dejerine–Sottas syndrome (MIM 145900) and Charcot–Marie–Tooth disease type 4F (MIM 145900).[supplied by OMIM]

References

Further reading

External links
  GeneReviews/NCBI/NIH/UW entry on Charcot-Marie-Tooth Neuropathy Type 4